Erik Rudeng (born 7 February 1946) is a Norwegian historian, administrator, essayist and biographer. He was born in Oslo. He worked for the publishing house Universitetsforlaget from 1981 to 1985. He was director of the Norwegian Museum of Cultural History from 1990 to 2000, and director of the institution Fritt Ord from 2001. Among his books are biographies of Johan Throne Holst and William Martin Nygaard.

References

1946 births
Living people
Writers from Oslo
20th-century Norwegian historians
Directors of museums in Norway
Norwegian publishers (people)
Norwegian essayists
Norwegian biographers
Norwegian male writers
Male biographers
Male essayists